Frederick Philip Mannix  (born February 24, 1942) is a Canadian billionaire businessman, and the chairman of the privately held Mancal Group, which is active in real estate, ranching, coal, oil and gas.

Early life
Fred Mannix was born on February 24, 1942. He is the eldest son of Frederick Charles Mannix and Margaret Mannix, and the grandson of Frederick Stephen Mannix. He has a brother, Ron, and a sister, Maureen. In 1966, he earned a bachelor's degree from the University of Alberta.

Career
In 2018, Canadian Business estimated the joint net worth of Fred and Ron Mannix at  billion.

Honours
In 2005, Mannix was made an Officer of the Order of Canada. In 2014, he was made a Member of the Alberta Order of Excellence.

Personal life
In 1982, he married Li-Anne Smith, and they have five children, including Fred Mannix Jr., a leading polo player.

References

Living people
1942 births
Canadian billionaires
Canadian chairpersons of corporations
Members of the Alberta Order of Excellence
Officers of the Order of Canada
Frederick P.